Sobol may refer to:

Sobol (surname)
Soból, Lublin Voivodeship, Poland, a village
Sobol, Oklahoma, United States
Sobol sequence, a kind of quasi-random sequence

See also
 
 Sobel (disambiguation)
 Sobole (disambiguation)

ru:Соболь (значения)